Garrya veatchii is a species of flowering shrub known by the common names canyon silktassel and Veatch silktassel.

It is native to the chaparral hills of Southern California and Baja California.

Description
Garrya veatchii is a small treelike or bushy shrub reaching maximum heights near . It has oval-shaped leaves 3 to 9 centimeters long and about half as wide with margins flat, wavy, or slightly rolled, and undersides covered thinly to thickly in woolly hairs.

It produces long, hanging inflorescences of light-colored flowers, those on female plants giving way to hanging clusters of fruits.

The fruit is a spherical to egg-shaped berry covered in a soft coat of hairs.

References

External links

Jepson Manual Treatment of Garrya veatchii
Garrya veatchii — U.C. Photo gallery

Garryales
Flora of Baja California
Flora of California
Natural history of the California chaparral and woodlands
Natural history of the California Coast Ranges
Natural history of the Channel Islands of California
Natural history of the Peninsular Ranges
Natural history of the Transverse Ranges
Flora without expected TNC conservation status